Grant Scott Fuhr (born September 28, 1962) is a Canadian former ice hockey goaltender in the National Hockey League and former goaltending coach for the Arizona Coyotes, who played for the Edmonton Oilers in the 1980s during which he won the Stanley Cup five times.

He was a six-time All-Star, and in 2003, he was inducted into the Hockey Hall of Fame.

In 2017, Fuhr was named one of the 100 Greatest NHL Players in history. He set a number of firsts for black hockey players in the NHL, including being the first to win the Stanley Cup and being the first inducted into the Hockey Hall of Fame.

Early life
Fuhr was born to one Afro-Canadian parent and one First Nation-Canadian parent from the Enoch Cree Nation; he was adopted by parents Betty Wheeler and Robert Fuhr and raised in Spruce Grove, Alberta.

In the mid-1970s, Fuhr played for the Enoch Tomahawks hockey team. Fuhr's mother came from Enoch Cree Nation.

In 1979, at the age of seventeen, Fuhr joined the Victoria Cougars of the WHL. After two outstanding seasons in Victoria, which included the league championship and a trip to the Memorial Cup in 1981, Fuhr was drafted eighth overall by the Edmonton Oilers in the 1981 NHL Entry Draft, on June 10, 1981.

Edmonton Oilers (1981–1991)
Fuhr played ten seasons for the Oilers, where he teamed up first with Andy Moog, then Bill Ranford to form one of the most formidable goaltending tandems in history, winning the Stanley Cup four times in five seasons (1983-84 through '87-88). Moog was given the starting job in the 1983 playoffs, and helped lead the Oilers to their first Stanley Cup Finals, though they were swept by the New York Islanders, who captured their fourth straight Stanley Cup. The next year general manager and head coach Glen Sather chose to go with Fuhr in the 1984 playoffs, though Fuhr was injured in the third game of the Stanley Cup Finals in a rematch against the Islanders when he collided with Pat LaFontaine, so Moog stepped in and led the Oilers to a series win. Thereafter, Fuhr remained the number one goaltender. Fuhr was also involved with the infamous goal where Steve Smith scored on his own net to cost the Oilers the '86 playoffs against the Calgary Flames. Fuhr was the team's starting goaltender on the first four teams, but was injured and did not play in the 1990 playoffs, when the Oilers won for the fifth time.

In 1987, Fuhr played in goal for the NHL All-Stars in both games of the Rendez-Vous '87 series against the Soviet National Team. In 1987-88, Fuhr backstopped Canada to a victory at the Canada Cup, playing in all nine games, then played in 75 regular season and 19 playoff games. He won his only Vezina Trophy as the NHL's top goaltender that year and finished second in voting for the Hart Memorial Trophy as league MVP, behind Mario Lemieux and ahead of teammate Wayne Gretzky. He also played in the National Hockey League All-Star Game in 1984, 1985, 1986, 1988, and 1989. Fuhr's playoff success fed into his reputation as the supreme clutch goaltender of his era, and there was a period of time from 1987 through at least 1989 where Fuhr was often called "the best goaltender in the world".

Fuhr was suspended by the NHL for 59 games of the 1990–91 season. Fuhr had come forward about his drug use after spending two weeks in a counselling centre in Florida. He admitted that he used "a substance" (not specifying whether or not it was cocaine) for some seven years, or most of the period that the Oilers rested at the top of the NHL. Details of Fuhr's drug use were supplied by his ex-wife, Corrine, who told the press in Edmonton that she often found cocaine hidden in his clothing and that she fielded numerous threatening telephone calls from drug dealers who had not been paid. These embarrassing details no doubt contributed to the one-year suspension handed down in September 1990 by NHL president John Ziegler, who called Fuhr's conduct "dishonorable and against the welfare of the league."  After missing 59 games and entering a two-week rehab program, the suspension was lifted by the league on February 18, 1991. Once Fuhr was re-instated, fans of opposing teams taunted him at games with bags of sugar.

Post-Oilers career (1991–2000)
On September 19, 1991, Fuhr was traded to the Toronto Maple Leafs in a seven-player deal. After a season and a half in Toronto, he was again traded, this time to the Buffalo Sabres, on February 2, 1993.

In Buffalo, he played a role in the Sabres' dramatic first-round playoff victory over the Boston Bruins, helped instill a winning attitude in the organization, and mentored a still relatively inexperienced Dominik Hašek. Fuhr then had a successful 1993–94 season with the Sabres, initially sharing goaltending duties with Hašek. Hašek became the Sabres' full time starting goaltender after Fuhr suffered multiple injuries. Fuhr and Hašek were awarded the William M. Jennings Trophy for the fewest goals allowed.

In May 1993, while a member of the Sabres, Fuhr was denied membership in the neighbouring Transit Valley Country Club. At the time, rumours floated that the denial was based on race, as several of Fuhr's white teammates had been granted membership. Club officials denied they rejected Fuhr based on his race; rather, his application contained "incorrect and incomplete" information. Various acts of vandalism at the club occurred after news of Fuhr's rejection surfaced, including an incident where vandals burned a swastika onto one of the greens. In light of the negative publicity, the club reversed its position and offered Fuhr not only a membership, but an apology as well. Fuhr rejected the membership and joined nearby Lancaster Country Club. The club also temporarily suspended its membership committee and had an anti-bias policy written into its by-laws.

With Hasek now ensconced in the Sabres' net, Fuhr was dealt to the Los Angeles Kings, on February 14, 1994, reuniting him with Gretzky. Although he began the season out of shape and was considered to be past his prime, his career saw a resurgence when he signed as a free agent with the St. Louis Blues on July 14, 1995, before the 1995–96 campaign. He played 79 games that season, 76 consecutively, both NHL records. On November 30, 1995, Fuhr earned his 300th career win versus the Winnipeg Jets. Fuhr and Gretzky became teammates for the third time when the Blues acquired Gretzky in a trade with the Kings on February 27, 1996. The 1996 playoff run for Fuhr ended prematurely as Maple Leafs forward Nick Kypreos ran into him in the crease in the first round, causing him to tear several knee ligaments. Jon Casey had to play the rest of the playoffs. The Blues beat Toronto in the first round, but lost to Detroit in the next. Even though over the next three years he became one of the three winningest goaltenders in Blues history (along with Mike Liut and Curtis Joseph), Fuhr never fully recovered from his injury. After the Blues signed Roman Turek as their new number one goaltender in 1999, Fuhr was traded to the Calgary Flames on September 5, 1999. He spent one season there being a mentor for Calgary's young goalies, including Fred Brathwaite, and on October 22, 1999, he earned his 400th career win against the Florida Panthers. He announced his retirement on September 6, 2000.

International play
Fuhr was named to the 1984 Canada Cup team but saw limited action during the tournament due to an injury. Fuhr was again selected to represent Canada for the 1987 Canada Cup. It was here that he cemented his reputation as one of the best goaltenders in the game. Playing against a tough Soviet Union squad, Fuhr turned away shot after shot during the three-game final. He also played for Canada at the 1989 World Championships where he won a silver medal.

Post-retirement
Fuhr was hired to be the Phoenix Coyotes goaltending coach on July 22, 2004. Fuhr held the position until the end of the 2008-09 season, when he was replaced by Sean Burke. He held a similar post with the Calgary Flames in the 2000–2001 and 2001–2002 seasons.

In 2015, Fuhr collaborated on his biography with Bruce Dowbiggin, Grant Fuhr: The Story of a Hockey Legend.

Personal life
Fuhr was married to Lisa Cavanaugh in the Grand Cayman Islands on September 14, 2014.  He has four children from previous marriages and a step-daughter.

Fuhr was a regular competitor at the American Century Championship, an annual competition to determine the best golfers among American sports and entertainment celebrities. The tournament is played at Edgewood Tahoe Golf Course along the edge of Lake Tahoe.

Awards

International

In 1998, he was ranked number 70 on The Hockey News' list of the 100 Greatest Hockey Players.
His #31 was retired by the Edmonton Oilers on October 9, 2003.
Inducted into the Hockey Hall of Fame in 2003.
Inducted into the Alberta Sports Hall of Fame in 2004.

Hall of Fame induction
Fuhr was inducted into the Hockey Hall of Fame on November 2, 2003.

Wayne Gretzky has said on many occasions that he believes Fuhr is the greatest goaltender in NHL history. This is mentioned in an interview with Wayne Gretzky conducted by John Davidson as part of the 2003 DVD "Ultimate Gretzky".

Fuhr was also inducted in the Alberta Sports Hall of Fame in 2004.

Records
 Holds NHL record for most assists and points by a goaltender regular season and playoffs combined - 61
 Holds NHL record for longest undefeated streak by a goaltender in his first NHL season - 23 in 1981–82.
 Holds NHL record for most assists in a single season by a goaltender - 14 in 1983–84.
 Holds NHL record for most games played by a goaltender in a single season - 79 in 1995–96.
 Holds NHL record for most consecutive appearances in a single season by a goaltender - 76 in 1996.

Transactions
Traded to Toronto by Edmonton with Glenn Anderson and Craig Berube for Vincent Damphousse, Peter Ing, Scott Thornton and Luke Richardson, September 19, 1991.
Traded to Buffalo by Toronto with Toronto's 5th round choice (Kevin Popp) in 1995 Entry Draft for Dave Andreychuk, Daren Puppa and Buffalo's 1st round choice (Kenny Jönsson) in 1993 Entry Draft, February 2, 1993.
Traded to Los Angeles by Buffalo with Philippe Boucher and Denis Tsygurov for Alexei Zhitnik, Robb Stauber, Charlie Huddy and Los Angeles' 5th round choice (Marian Menhart) in 1995 Entry Draft, February 14, 1995.
Signed as a free agent by St. Louis, July 14, 1995.
Traded to Calgary by St. Louis for Calgary's 3rd round choice (Justin Papineau) in 2000 Entry Draft, September 4, 1999.
Officially announced retirement, September 6, 2000.

Career statistics

Regular season and playoffs

International

See also
List of black NHL players
List of NHL goaltenders with 300 wins

References

External links

 Grant Fuhr biography at hockeygoalies.org - advanced statistics and game logs
One on One at Legends of Hockey.com
Audio interview re: NutriSystem May 2008

1962 births
Arizona Coyotes coaches
Black Canadian ice hockey players
Buffalo Sabres players
Calgary Flames coaches
Calgary Flames players
Canadian adoptees
Canadian ice hockey goaltenders
Cape Breton Oilers players
Canadian sportspeople in doping cases
Doping cases in ice hockey
Edmonton Oilers draft picks
Edmonton Oilers players
Hockey Hall of Fame inductees
Ice hockey people from Alberta
Living people
Los Angeles Kings players
Moncton Alpines (AHL) players
National Hockey League All-Stars
National Hockey League first-round draft picks
National Hockey League players with retired numbers
People from Spruce Grove
Rochester Americans players
Saint John Flames players
St. Louis Blues players
Stanley Cup champions
Toronto Maple Leafs players
Vezina Trophy winners
Victoria Cougars (WHL) players
William M. Jennings Trophy winners
Canadian ice hockey coaches